Varshavsky station (Varshavsky vokzal), or Warsaw station, is a former passenger railway station in Saint Petersburg, Russia. It is located to the south of the city centre, and was in operation from 1853 to 2001 From 2001 to 2017 it served as the home of the Russian Railway Museum (also known as the Russian Federation Central Museum of Railway Transport).

History
The station was originally built in 1851 for a rail line, completed in 1858, from the city to the Tsar's residence in Gatchina. The line was extended in 1859 to Pskov and in 1862 to Warsaw, which at that time was a part of Congress Poland and the Russian Empire. A branch from the main line that ran to the Prussian border at Virbalis (now Lithuania) connected Saint Petersburg to other capitals of Europe.

The current building was designed by Piotr Salmanovich in a mixture of historical styles. It was constructed between 1857 and 1860. A church was built in front of the station in 1908; it was later demolished and a Lenin statue by Soviet sculptor Nikolai Tomsky appeared in 1949.

In 2001, the station was closed, with long distance rail service diverted to Vitebsky railway station and commuter service to Baltiysky Rail Terminal, and the depiction of Lenin removed.  The trade center Warsaw Express has occupied the building since 2005.

On the tracks, a railway museum used to display 80 exhibits of steam engines, electric and diesel locomotives. The Museum is closed, and the exhibits have been relocated to the Russian Railway Museum adjacent to Baltiysky railway station, which opened on 1 November 2017.

Future
The train depot of the Ladozhsky station is now proposed at the former Varshavsky station track area.

See also
 The Museum of the Moscow Railway, at Paveletsky railway station, Moscow
 Rizhsky railway station, Home of the Moscow Railway Museum
 History of rail transport in Russia 
 List of railway museums (worldwide)
 Heritage railways
 List of heritage railways
 Restored trains
 Finland Station, St.Petersburg
 Emperor railway station in Pushkin town
 List of Russian steam locomotive classes
 Tsarskoye Selo Railway
 Ladozhsky railway station: The successor of the Varshavsky station.

Sources 

  Reconstruction of the Warsaw Railway Station

External links 

 Station site with many images
 Report on a visit to the Varshavsky station
The Museum of the Moscow Railway Photographs
Lenin's Funeral Train Photographs
Paveletsky Rail station Official site
The Moscow Railway Museum at Rizhsky railway station, Moscow
156 photos of the Varshavsky Station Railway Museum

Railway stations in the Russian Empire opened in 1860
Railway stations in Saint Petersburg
Railway stations closed in 2001
1851 establishments in the Russian Empire
Cultural heritage monuments in Saint Petersburg